is a former Japanese journalist and biographer of former Japanese Prime Minister Shinzo Abe. He is accused of raping Shiori Itō, who was an intern at Thomson Reuters. His denials and the police refusing to press rape charges against Yamaguchi sparked the Me too movement in Japan.

History
Noriyuki Yamaguchi was born in Tokyo, Japan, in 1966. He attended the Keio University Faculty of Economics. He later joined the Tokyo Broadcasting System Television where was assigned to the news department as a photojournalist. His overseas assignments included London, England, Phnom Penh, Cambodia, and Washington, DC, US. After retiring, he appeared on TV programs such as TV Asahi and Fuji TV and on the radio.

On April 23, 2015, he was dismissed as Washington bureau chief and moved from the news bureau to the sales bureau. On May 30, 2016, he left TBS Television to become a visiting fellow at the East West Center, an American think tank, with journalists.

According to Yamaguchi's Facebook account, he is now self-employed.

Biographer for Shinzo Abe
Yamaguchi is the personal biographer for Shinzo Abe, the former prime minister of Japan. He published two books while Abe was still the incumbent prime minister.

Works
 America Invaded by China (中国に侵略されたアメリカ)
 Prime Minister (総理)
 Dark Fight (暗闘)

Sexual assault litigation

Shiori Itō formally filed a suit against Yamaguchi in September 2017 for sexually assaulting her in a hotel on 4 April 2015. Itō previously filed a police report in July 2016, although it was dropped by prosecutors for insufficient evidence. Itaru Nakamura, a close confidant of both Prime Minister Abe and Yamaguchi and acting chief of the Tokyo Metropolitan Police Department Investigative Division at the time, admitted in the weekly magazine Shukan Shincho to have halted the probe and arrest warrant. Ito subsequently filed a complaint with Committee for the Inquest of Prosecution, but a September 2017 ruling did not charge Yamaguchi since "there was no common law basis to overturn."

A Tokyo court in December 2019 awarded Itō 3.3 million yen (US$30,000) plus additional fees in damages from Yamaguchi; however, he stated that he would appeal the decision. (She had initially sought from Yamaguchi 11 million yen (US$100,000) in compensation.) Yamaguchi denied the charges and filed a countersuit against Itō, seeking 130 million yen (US$1,180,000) in compensation, claiming the incident was consensual and the ensuing accusations has damaged his reputation, although that suit was later turned down due to inconsistencies in his testimony. This ruling has garnered international press due to the lack of reported sexual assaults in Japan and the amount of societal and legal crucibles Itō had to endure for speaking up.

The Japanese high court upheld the lower court ruling in favor of Itō ordering Yamaguchi to pay 3.3 million yen to her. The presiding judge concluded that Yamaguchi began sexual intercourse with an unconscious Itō. The court also ordered Itō to pay 550,000 yen to Yamaguchi for damages for defaming him by claiming in her book accusing him of giving her a date drug with no evidence. Both have appealed their rulings.  The top court also ordered Ito to pay Yamaguchi 550,000 yen for defamation. 

Ito's book Black Box, talks about the alleged incident and her experiences that followed. An English translation of the book was published on July 13, 2021.

Disputes with Yoshinori Kobayashi
On 24 January 2019, Yamaguchi filed a civil suit against cartoonist Yoshinori Kobayashi. Yamaguchi stated that Kobayashi disseminated false information completely different from the facts in the manga Gomanism Declaration drawn by Kobayashi in the SAPIO magazine's August 2017 issue, where Yamaguchi was depicted as a criminal.

External links
Noriyuki Yamaguchi's Facebook
Noriyuki Yamaguchi's Twitter account

References

Living people
1966 births
Japanese journalists
Rape in Japan
Shinzo Abe
Violence against women in Japan
Keio University alumni